Héctor Mesa Monsalve was a Colombian road cyclist active during the 1950s.

Major results
1953
 3rd Overall Vuelta a Colombia
1st Stage 14
1954
 Central American and Caribbean Games
1st  Team time trial (with Ramón Hoyos, Justo Londoño and Efraín Forero)
1st  Road race
 3rd Road race, National Road Championships
 3rd Overall Vuelta a Colombia
1st Stages 1 & 12
1956
 1st Stage 10 Vuelta a Colombia
1957
 2nd Road race, National Road Championships

References

External links

Colombian male cyclists
Possibly living people
Year of birth missing
Sportspeople from Antioquia Department